John Louis Joachim (April 8, 1874 – October 21, 1942) was an American rower who competed in the 1904 Summer Olympics. He was born in Ohio and died in St. Louis, Missouri. In 1904 he won the bronze medal in the coxless pairs.

References

External links
 profile

1874 births
1942 deaths
Rowers at the 1904 Summer Olympics
Olympic bronze medalists for the United States in rowing
American male rowers
Medalists at the 1904 Summer Olympics